Sulev Vahtre (July 6, 1926 – August 31, 2007) was an eminent Estonian historian.

Vahtre was born in Laiuse Parish (now Jõgeva Parish, Jõgeva County). He ended his studyings in University of Tartu in 1955 and worked there until 1993. He studied Estonian agrarian history, medieval chronicles, cultural history, Estonia's Christianization in the 13th century and St. George's Night Uprising. In 1973 he received a PhD. In 1989 Vahtre reestablished the chair of Estonian history University of Tartu and was its chairman until his retirement in 1993. Until his death in Tartu he was the most important historian in Estonia,  the chief editor of the sequence of Estonian history (he edited volumes IV and VI) and also a book of Estonian Chronology (first edition 1994, second 2007).

His older son Silver Vahtre is an artist, younger son Lauri Vahtre is a politician and historian.

External links
Tõnis Lukas Päevaleht: Professor Sulev Vahtre - Eesti tuntuim ajaloolane
Alo Lõhmus Postimees: In memoriam - Sulev Vahtre
Mart Laar Päevaleht: Ajaloolane Sulev Vahtre võitles vaba mehena vabaduse eest
UT: In memoriam: prof emer Sulev Vahtre

1926 births
2007 deaths
People from Jõgeva Parish
20th-century Estonian historians
Historians of Estonia
Estonian medievalists
University of Tartu alumni
Academic staff of the University of Tartu
Recipients of the Order of the National Coat of Arms, 3rd Class